Leon Cameron (born 2 September 1972) is a former Australian rules footballer who is the former senior coach of the Greater Western Sydney Giants (GWS) in the Australian Football League (AFL).

AFL playing career

Footscray/Western Bulldogs
Cameron was recruited from South Warrnambool Football Club with the 7th selection in the 1988 National Draft for the Footscray Football Club (Bulldogs). He played 172 games and kicked 68 goals for the Bulldogs between 1990 and 1999 and won the Charles Sutton Medal in 1993 and The Age Footballer of the Year award in 1995.

Richmond
In 2000, Cameron was traded to the Richmond Football Club where he played a further 84 games and kicked 40 goals over four seasons before retiring at the end of the 2003 AFL season.

AFL coaching career

Assistant coaching roles
After retirement Cameron returned to the Western Bulldogs as an assistant coach from 2004 to the end of 2010. In September 2010 he accepted an assistant coaching role with Hawthorn, playing an instrumental role in the club as they reached the 2012 AFL Grand Final, which was lost to the  Swans. It was Cameron's first Grand Final as an AFL player or coach after three preliminary final losses as a player (two at the Western Bulldogs and one at ) and another four as an assistant coach (three at the Bulldogs and one at Hawthorn).

Cameron then joined Greater Western Sydney as the senior assistant coach for the 2013 season with a contract that appointed him as the senior coach from 2014.

First senior coaching role

Greater Western Sydney
On 1 September 2013, after Kevin Sheedy coached his 679th and final game as a senior coach in the VFL-AFL, the competing teams formed a guard of honour for Sheedy and a handover ceremony took place with Sheedy passing the baton to Leon Cameron who succeeded him as senior coach. Cameron's contract, signed in October 2012, stipulated one year as assistant coach under senior coach Sheedy and then 3 years as the senior coach.

Despite the Giants making the 2021 AFL finals series, Cameron resigned as senior coach of GWS Giants on 12 May 2022 after eight years in the senior coaching role. This followed a string of poor on-field results for the Giants, and saw Cameron replaced by assistant coach Mark McVeigh as GWS caretaker senior coach for the rest of the 2022 season, following a farewell game against Carlton in Round 9, 2022. In the match, GWS lost by a margin of 30 points, and Cameron left the field through a guard of honour from both sides.

Statistics

Playing statistics

|-
|- style="background-color: #EAEAEA"
! scope="row" style="text-align:center" | 1990
|style="text-align:center;"|
| 18 || 20 || 8 || 10 || 258 || 129 || 387 || 74 || 13 || 0.4 || 0.5 || 12.9 || 6.5 || 19.4 || 3.7 || 0.7 || 10
|-
! scope="row" style="text-align:center" | 1991
|style="text-align:center;"|
| 18 || 19 || 10 || 11 || 241 || 79 || 320 || 57 || 10 || 0.5 || 0.6 || 12.7 || 4.2 || 16.8 || 3.0 || 0.5 || 2
|- style="background-color: #EAEAEA"
! scope="row" style="text-align:center" | 1992
|style="text-align:center;"|
| 18 || 3 || 0 || 0 || 22 || 7 || 29 || 1 || 0 || 0.0 || 0.0 || 7.3 || 2.3 || 9.7 || 0.3 || 0.0 || 0
|-
! scope="row" style="text-align:center" | 1993
|style="text-align:center;"|
| 18 || 19 || 8 || 11 || 314 || 123 || 437 || 59 || 24 || 0.4 || 0.6 || 16.5 || 6.5 || 23.0 || 3.1 || 1.3 || 14
|- style="background-color: #EAEAEA"
! scope="row" style="text-align:center" | 1994
|style="text-align:center;"|
| 18 || 24 || 13 || 24 || 328 || 136 || 464 || 97 || 25 || 0.5 || 1.0 || 13.7 || 5.7 || 19.3 || 4.0 || 1.0 || 13
|-
! scope="row" style="text-align:center" | 1995
|style="text-align:center;"|
| 18 || 23 || 7 || 19 || 336 || 135 || 471 || 85 || 24 || 0.3 || 0.8 || 14.6 || 5.9 || 20.5 || 3.7 || 1.0 || 7
|- style="background-color: #EAEAEA"
! scope="row" style="text-align:center" | 1996
|style="text-align:center;"|
| 18 || 8 || 3 || 1 || 74 || 28 || 102 || 22 || 9 || 0.4 || 0.1 || 9.3 || 3.5 || 12.8 || 2.8 || 1.1 || 0
|-
! scope="row" style="text-align:center" | 1997
|style="text-align:center;"|
| 18 || 17 || 6 || 10 || 207 || 59 || 266 || 62 || 7 || 0.4 || 0.6 || 12.2 || 3.5 || 15.6 || 3.6 || 0.4 || 3
|- style="background-color: #EAEAEA"
! scope="row" style="text-align:center" | 1998
|style="text-align:center;"|
| 18 || 22 || 6 || 5 || 276 || 90 || 366 || 80 || 19 || 0.3 || 0.2 || 12.5 || 4.1 || 16.6 || 3.6 || 0.9 || 0
|-
! scope="row" style="text-align:center" | 1999
|style="text-align:center;"|
| 18 || 17 || 7 || 11 || 164 || 63 || 227 || 57 || 6 || 0.4 || 0.6 || 9.6 || 3.7 || 13.4 || 3.4 || 0.4 || 2
|- style="background-color: #EAEAEA"
! scope="row" style="text-align:center" | 2000
|style="text-align:center;"|
| 15 || 19 || 3 || 3 || 257 || 79 || 336 || 73 || 19 || 0.2 || 0.2 || 13.5 || 4.2 || 17.7 || 3.8 || 1.0 || 3
|-
! scope="row" style="text-align:center" | 2001
|style="text-align:center;"|
| 15 || 25 || 19 || 6 || 344 || 139 || 483 || 111 || 33 || 0.8 || 0.2 || 13.8 || 5.6 || 19.3 || 4.4 || 1.3 || 11
|- style="background-color: #EAEAEA"
! scope="row" style="text-align:center" | 2002
|style="text-align:center;"|
| 15 || 19 || 2 || 10 || 184 || 91 || 275 || 59 || 23 || 0.1 || 0.5 || 9.7 || 4.8 || 14.5 || 3.1 || 1.2 || 2
|-
! scope="row" style="text-align:center" | 2003
|style="text-align:center;"|
| 15 || 21 || 16 || 4 || 175 || 57 || 232 || 90 || 15 || 0.8 || 0.2 || 8.3 || 2.7 || 11.0 || 4.3 || 0.7 || 1
|- class="sortbottom"
! colspan=3| Career
! 256
! 108
! 125
! 3180
! 1215
! 4395
! 927
! 227
! 0.4
! 0.5
! 12.4
! 4.7
! 17.2
! 3.6
! 0.9
! 68
|}

Coaching statistics
 

|- style="background-color: #EAEAEA"
| scope="row" style="font-weight:normal"|2014
|
| 22 || 6 || 16 || 0 || 27.3% || 16 || 18
|-
| scope="row" style="font-weight:normal"|2015
|
| 22 || 11 || 11 || 0 || 50.0% || 11 || 18
|- style="background-color: #EAEAEA"
| scope="row" style="font-weight:normal"|2016
|
| 24 || 17 || 7 || 0 || 70.8% || 4 || 18
|-
| scope="row" style="font-weight:normal"|2017
|
| 25 || 15 || 8 || 2 || 60.0% || 4 || 18
|- style="background-color: #EAEAEA"
|scope="row" style="font-weight:normal"|2018
|
| 24 || 14 || 9 || 0 || 58.3% || 7 || 18
|-
|scope="row" style="font-weight:normal"|2019
|
| 26 || 16 || 10 || 1 || 61.5% || 6 || 18
|- style="background-color: #EAEAEA"
|scope="row" style="font-weight:normal"|2020
|
| 17 || 8 || 9 || 0 || 47.1% || 10 || 18
|-
|scope="row" style="font-weight:normal"|2021
|
| 24 || 12 || 11 || 1 || 52.1% || 7 || 18
|- style="background-color: #EAEAEA"
|scope="row" style="font-weight:normal"|2022
|
| 9 || 2 || 7 || 0 || 22.2% || 15 || 18
|- class="sortbottom"
! colspan=2| Career totals
! 193
! 101
! 88
! 4
! 53.37%
! colspan=2|
|}

Notes

References

External links

GWS website

1972 births
Living people
Australian rules footballers from Victoria (Australia)
Richmond Football Club players
Western Bulldogs players
Greater Western Sydney Giants coaches
Charles Sutton Medal winners
South Warrnambool Football Club players
Victorian State of Origin players